Magdalena Joanna Sroka (née Wolter; born 15 July 1979) is a Polish police officer and politician, serving as a member of the Sejm. She is the spokesperson for the Agreement political party.

Life and career 
Magdalena Joanna Sroka graduated from the Academy of Physical Education and Sport in Gdańsk in 2003. In 2006 she studied human resources management at the University of Gdańsk, and continued with Executive Master of Business Administration in 2019. She is also a sports instructor. In 2018, she became a councillor of the Pomorskie Voivodeship Parliament, and then the vice-chairman of the local government and public safety committee in the parliamentary elections, which took place in October 2019. She has been an expert in the field of security for over 15 years, she has been involved professionally and socially, working in government and local government institutions.

Currently, she also runs her own business, providing consultancy in the field of broadly understood security. For many years she has been active in the community, implementing educational and training programs aimed at children and youth, as well as women and seniors.

References 

University of Gdańsk alumni
Polish police officers
1979 births
Living people
Members of the Polish Sejm 2019–2023